Antoine Christophe Saliceti (baptised in the name of Antonio Cristoforo Saliceti: Antoniu Cristufaru Saliceti in Corsican; 26 August 175723 December 1809) was a French politician and diplomat of the Revolution and First Empire.

Early career
He was born a member of a Piacentine family in Saliceto, Haute-Corse. He was born during the era of the Corsican Republic, but after the Conquest of Corsica the island became French. After studying law in Tuscany, he became a lawyer at the upper council of Bastia, and was elected deputy of the Third Estate to the French Estates-General of 1789.

As deputy to the National Convention, Saliceti became a Montagnard and on 15 January 1793 voted for the death of King Louis XVI, and was sent to Corsica on mission to oversee Pasquale Paoli and enforce the Reign of Terror; however, he was compelled to withdraw to Provence, where he took part in repressing the revolts at Marseille and Toulon.  During this time he met and promoted his compatriot Napoleon Bonaparte.

Directory, Consulate, and Empire
On account of his friendship with Maximilien Robespierre, Saliceti was denounced by the Thermidorian Reaction and was saved only by the amnesty of the French Directory. In 1796 Saliceti was commissioned to organize the French Revolutionary Army in the Italian Peninsula, and the two départements into which Corsica had been divided after its recapture. Saliceti also became deputy to the Council of the Five Hundred, and served the Directory in missions to the Ligurian Republic. Saliceti represented France during the negotiations with the Papal States regarding the Armistice of Bologna.

Although an adversary of Napoleon's 18 Brumaire Coup which created the Consulate (9 November 1799), he was kept by Napoleon as his representative to the Republic of Lucca (1801–1802) and Liguria (1805), engineering the territory's annexation to the Empire. In 1806, he followed Joseph Bonaparte to the Kingdom of Naples, where Joseph had been imposed as King, and served as minister of police and of war. Saliceti died in Naples in mysterious circumstances, possibly poisoned.

References

1757 births
1809 deaths
People from Haute-Corse
Corsican politicians
Deputies to the French National Convention
First French Empire
French diplomats
18th-century French lawyers
French people of Italian descent
People of the Reign of Terror